San Marine is an unincorporated community and census-designated place (CDP) in Lincoln County, Oregon, United States. It was first listed as a CDP prior to the 2020 census.

The CDP is in southern Lincoln County, along the Pacific Ocean. U.S. Route 101 passes through the CDP, leading north  to Waldport and south  to Yachats.

Demographics

References 

Census-designated places in Lincoln County, Oregon
Census-designated places in Oregon